Phractura lindica is a species of catfish in the genus Phractura. Its length is 9 cm SL. It lives in the Congo River system.

References

lindica
Freshwater fish of Central Africa
Congo drainage basin
Fish described in 1902
Taxa named by George Albert Boulenger